Puneeth Rajkumar was an Indian film actor, playback singer and producer who worked in the Kannada film industry. He has been nominated for and won various awards throughout his career. On November 1st, 2022, he was awarded Karnataka Ratna after his death. On 22 March 2022, he was posthumously awarded honorary doctorate from University of Mysore at its 102nd convocation

Awards and nominations

Other Honors
 The State Government announced to mark his birthday as "Inspiration Day".
 The 212th edition of Lalbagh flower show was dedicated as a tribute to him and his father matinee idol Dr.Rajkumar.
 His tableau was made on the occasion of 2022 Mysore Dasara Jamboo Savari procession.
 Dolls conceptualized on him were reported to be the highlight of 2022 Dasara doll display.
 An entire day was dedicated to screen his movies at the 2022 Dasara Film Festival.
 He was posthumously conferred with the Lifetime Achievement Award at the 67th Filmfare Awards.
 On October 22 & 23, 2022 restaurants of Bengaluru hosted a food festival - Flavours of Gandhada Gudi on the occasion of his last theatrical release Gandhada Gudi. 
 All the 200 Kannada movies which released within one year of his demise, paid tribute to him in their opening credits.
 75 cutouts with garlands were erected outside his memorial on his first death anniversary.
 One of the 75 satellites intended to be launched into orbit during November 15 to December 2022 on the occasion of the 75th year of Indian independence was named after him.
 The Bengaluru Outer Ring Road 12-km stretch between Nayandahalli Junction on Mysuru Road and Vega City Mall on Bannerghatta Road was named as Dr. Puneeth Rajkumar Road.
 23 Feet height statue of Puneeth was unvieled as part of inauguration of the Ballari Utsava in Bellary in 2023.

References

External links
 

Rajkumar, Puneeth